Bharat Desai (born November 1952) is an American billionaire businessman, and the co-founder and chairman of Syntel.

Early life 
Bharat Desai was born in November 1952, in Kenya. He is of Gujarati Indian origin. In his childhood, he lived in Mombasa and Ahmedabad. Desai received a bachelor's degree in electrical engineering from the Indian Institute of Technology Bombay and an MBA in finance from the Stephen M. Ross School of Business.

Career 
Desai co-founded Syntel, with his wife Neerja Sethi, of which he is the chairman.

Desai is a board member of several educational institutions, including the John F. Kennedy School of Government at Harvard University, Students in Free Enterprise (SIFE) and the Stephen M. Ross School of Business at the University of Michigan.

Personal life 
He is married to Neerja Sethi, and they have two children.

References 

Living people
1952 births
American billionaires
American people of Indian descent
American businesspeople
Ross School of Business alumni
Harvard Kennedy School people
IIT Bombay alumni
Gujarati people
American people of Gujarati descent